Boletus quercophilus is a species of porcini-like fungus native to Costa Rica, where it grows under Quercus copeyensis and Quercus seemannii.

References

quercophilus
Fungi of Central America
Fungi described in 1999